Qaleh-ye Gomesh Dafeh (also Romanized as Qal‘eh-ye Gomesh Dafeh; also known as Gīsh Dafeh) is a village in Jafarbay-ye Sharqi Rural District, Gomishan District, Torkaman County, Golestan Province, Iran. At the 2006 census, its population was 404, in 74 families.

References 

Populated places in Torkaman County